"Count Your Blessings, Woman" is a single by American country music artist Jan Howard. Released in February 1968, the song reached #16 on the Billboard Hot Country Singles chart. The single was later released on Howard's 1968 album of the same name. The song was written by fellow country artist, Bill Anderson. The song additionally peaked at #8 on the Canadian RPM Country Tracks chart, her first single to chart in Canada.

Chart performance

References 

1968 singles
Jan Howard songs
Songs written by Bill Anderson (singer)
Song recordings produced by Owen Bradley
Decca Records singles
1968 songs